The University of Lviv (briefly known as the Theresianum in the early 19th century), presently the Ivan Franko National University of Lviv, is the oldest institution of higher learning in present-day Ukraine dating from 1661 when John II Casimir, King of Poland, granted it its first royal charter. Over the centuries, it has undergone various transformations, suspensions, and name changes that have reflected the geopolitical complexities of this part of Europe. The present institution can be dated to 1940. It is located in the historic city of Lviv in Lviv Oblast of Western Ukraine.

History

Polish–Lithuanian Commonwealth 
The university was founded on January 20, 1661, when King John II Casimir of Poland granted a charter to the city's Jesuit Collegium, founded in 1608, giving it "the honor of an academy and the title of a university". In 1589, the Jesuits had tried to found a university earlier, but did not succeed. Establishing another seat of learning in the Kingdom of Poland was seen as a threat by the authorities of Kraków's Jagiellonian University, which did not want a rival and stymied the Jesuits' plans for the following years.

According to the Treaty of Hadiach (1658), an Orthodox Ruthenian academy was to be created in Kyiv and another one in an unspecified location. The Jesuits suspected that it would be established in Lwów/Lviv on the foundations of the Orthodox Brotherhood's school, and used this as a pretext for obtaining a royal mandate that elevated their college to the status of an academy (no city could have two academies). King John II Casimir was a supporter of the Jesuits and his stance was crucial. The original royal charter was subsequently confirmed by another decree issued in Częstochowa on February 5, 1661.

In 1758, King Augustus III issued a decree, which described the Collegium as an academy, equal in fact status to the Jagiellonian University, with two faculties, those of Theology and Philosophy.

Austrian rule 
In 1772, the city of Lwów was annexed by Austria (see: Partitions of Poland). Its German name was Lemberg and hence that of the university. In 1773 the Suppression of the Society of Jesus by Rome (Dominus ac Redemptor) was soon followed by the partition of the Polish-Lithuanian Commonwealth which meant that the university was excluded from the Commission of National Education reform. It was renamed Theresianum by the Austrians, i.e. a State Academy. On 21 October 1784, the Austrian Emperor Joseph II signed an act of foundation of a secular university.  He began to Germanise the institution by bringing German-speaking professors from various parts of the empire. The university now had four faculties. To theology and philosophy were added those of law and medicine. Latin was the official language of the university, with Polish and German as auxiliary. Literary Slaveno-Rusyn (Ruthenian/Ukrainian) of the period had been used in the Studium Ruthenium (1787–1809), a special institute of the university for educating candidates for the Uniate (Greek-Catholic) priesthood.

In 1805, the university was closed, as Austria, then involved in the Napoleonic wars, did not have sufficient funds to support it. Instead, it operated as a high school. The university was reopened in 1817.  Officially Vienna described it as an "act of mercy", but the actual reasons were different. The Austrian government was aware of the pro-Polish stance of the Russian Emperor Alexander I and the Austrians wanted to challenge it. However, the quality of the university's education was not considered high. Latin was replaced by German and most professors were mediocre. The few good ones regarded their stay in Lemberg as a springboard to other centres.

In 1848, when the pan-European revolution reached Lemberg (see: Revolutions of 1848), students of the university created two organizations: "The Academic Legion" and "the Academic Committee" both of which demanded that the university be Polonized. The government in Vienna answered with force, and on November 2, 1848, the centre of the city was shelled by the troops led by General Hammerstein striking the buildings of the university, especially its library. A curfew was called and the university was temporarily closed. Major demand for Ukrainians was the education of teachers and promotion of Ukrainian culture through Ukrainian courses at the university and to this end, a committee for the Defense of Ukrainian Education was created.

It was reopened in January 1850, with only limited autonomy. After a few years the Austrians relented and on July 4, 1871 Vienna declared Polish and Ruthenian (Ukrainian) as the official languages at the university. Eight years later this was changed. The Austrian authorities declared Polish as the main teaching medium with Ruthenian and German as auxiliary. Examinations in the two latter languages were possible as long as the professors used them. This move created unrest among the Ruthenians (Ukrainians), who were demanding equal rights. In 1908, a Ruthenian student of the philosophy faculty, Miroslaw Siczynski, had assassinated the Polish governor of Galicia, .

Meanwhile, the University of Lemberg thrived, being one of two Polish language universities in Galicia, the other one was the Jagiellonian University in Kraków. Its professors were famous across Europe, with such renowned names as Wladyslaw Abraham, Oswald Balzer, Szymon Askenazy, Stanislaw Zakrzewski, Zygmunt Janiszewski, Kazimierz Twardowski, Benedykt Dybowski, Marian Smoluchowski and Ludwik Rydygier.

In the 1870s, Ivan Franko studied at Lemberg University. He entered world history as a well-known Ukrainian scholar, public figure, writer, and translator. In 1894, the newly founded Chair of World History and the History of Eastern Europe was headed by Professor Mykhailo Hrushevskyi (1866–1934), an outstanding scholar of Ukrainian History, founder of the Ukrainian Historical School, and author of the ten-volume "History of Ukraine-Rus'", hundreds of works on History, History of Literature, Historiography, and Source Studies. In 1904, a special summer course in Ukrainian studies was organized in Lviv, primarily for Eastern Ukrainian students.

The number of students grew from 1,732 in 1897 to 3,582 in 1906. Poles made up around 75% of the students, Ukrainians 20%, other nationalities 5%.
In mid-December 1910, Ukrainian women students at Lviv University established a Student Union's women's branch, their twenty members meeting regularly to discuss current affairs.  In July 1912, they met with their Jewish counterpart branch to discuss the representation of women in the student body of the university.

Second Polish Republic 

During the Interbellum period, the region was part of the Second Polish Republic and the university was known as "Jan Kazimierz University", in honor of its founder, King John II Casimir Vasa. The decision to name the school after the king was taken by the government of Poland on November 22, 1919.

In 1920, the university was rehoused by the Polish government in the building formerly used by the Sejm of the Land, which has since been the university's main location. Its first rector during the Second Polish Republic was the famous poet, Jan Kasprowicz.

Lwów was the second most important academic center in inter-war Poland. The Jan Kazimierz University was the third biggest university in the country after the University of Warsaw and the Jagiellonian University in Kraków. 
It was one of the most influential scholarly institutions of the Second Polish Republic, notable for its schools of mathematics (Stefan Banach, Hugo Steinhaus), logics (Kazimierz Twardowski), history and law (Oswald Balzer), anthropology (Jan Czekanowski), and geography (Eugeniusz Romer).

By September 1939, it expanded to 420,000 volumes, including 1,300 manuscripts, 3,000 diplomas and incunables, and possessed 14,000 numismatic items.

In 1924 the Philosophy Faculty was divided into Humanities and Mathematics and Biology Departments, thus there were now five faculties. In the 1934/35 academic year, the breakdown of the student body was as follows:
 Theology – 222 students
 Law – 2,978 students 
 Medicine – 638 students (together with the Pharmaceutical Section, which had 263 students) 
 Humanities – 892 students 
 Mathematics and Biology – 870 students

Altogether, during the academic year 1934/35, there were 5900 students at the university, consisting by religious observance of:
 3793 Roman Catholics (64.3%)
 1211 Jews (20.5%)
 739 Ukrainian Greek-Catholics (12.5%)
 72 Orthodox (1.2%)
 67 Protestants (1.1%)

Ukrainian professors were required to take a formal oath of allegiance to Poland; most of them refused and left the university in the early 1920s. The principle of "Numerus clausus" had been introduced after which Ukrainian applicants were discriminated against – Ukrainian applications were capped at 15% of the intake, whereas Poles enjoyed a 50% quota at the time.

World War II 
After the German invasion of Poland and the accompanying Soviet invasion in September 1939, the Soviet administration permitted classes to continue. Initially, the school worked in the pre-war Polish system.<ref name=Redzik>{{cite web |last1=Redzik |first1=Adam |title=Polish Universities During the Second World War. 'Encuentros de Historia Comparada Hispano-Polaca / Spotkania poświęcone historii porównawczej hiszpańsko-polskiej.
His role was to Ukranize and Sovietize the university. At the beginning of January 1940, the official name of the university was changed to Ivan Franko Lviv State University. Ukrainian was introduced as the language of instruction. Polish professors and administrative assistants were increasingly fired and replaced by cadres specializing in Marxism, Leninism, political economics, as well as Ukrainian and Soviet literature, history, and geography. This was accompanied by the closure of departments seen as related to religion, free-market economics, capitalism, or the West in general. All academics specializing in Polish geography, literature, and history were dismissed. Marchenko was released from his post in Spring 1940 and arrested in June 1941. From 1939 to 1941, the Soviets killed 17 and imprisoned 37 academics from the University of Jan Kazimierz.

After Lviv was occupied by the Nazi Germany in June 1941, the Germans closed the University of Ivan Franko and killed over 20 Polish professors (as well as members of their households and guests, increasing the total number of victims to above forty). The victims included lecturers from the University of Lviv and other local academic institutions. Among the killed was the last rector of the University of Jan Kazimierz, Roman Longchamps de Berier, his three sons, and the former Polish prime minister and a polytechnic professor, Kazimierz Bartel. The underground University of Jan Kazimierz was established in Autumn 1941.

In the summer of 1944, the advancing Red Army, assisted by the Polish Home Army forces (locally implementing Operation Tempest), pushed the Wehrmacht out of Lviv. and the university reopened. Due to post-war border changes, the Polish population of the city was expelled and most of Polish academics from the University of Jan Kazimierz relocated to Wrocław (former Breslau), where they filled positions in the newly established Polish institutions of higher learning. The buildings of the university had survived the war undestroyed, however, 80% of its pre-war student and academic body was gone. The traditions of Jan Kazimierz University have been duplicated at the University of Wrocław, which replaced the pre-war University of Breslau after the German inhabitants of that city had been expelled following Stalin's establishing Germany's eastern border farther to the west.

 Ukrainian SSR 

In 1964, a monument dedicated to Ivan Franko was built in front of the university.

 Independent Ukraine 

The proclamation of the independence of Ukraine in 1991 brought about radical changes in every sphere of university life.  Professor, Doctor Ivan Vakarchuk, a renowned scholar in the field of theoretical physics, had been rector of the university from 1990 to 2013. Meeting the requirements arising in recent years new faculties and departments have been set up: the Faculty of International Relations and the Faculty of Philosophy (1992), the Faculty of Pre-Entrance University Preparation (1997), the Chair of Translation Studies and Comparative Linguistics (1998). Since 1997 the following new units have come into existence within the teaching and research framework of the university: the Law College, The Humanities Centre, The Institute of Literature Studies, The Italian Language and Culture Resource Centre. The teaching staff of the university has increased amounting to 981, with scholarly degrees awarded to over two-thirds of the entire teaching staff. There are over one hundred laboratories and working units as well as the Computing Centre functioning here. The Zoological, Geological, Mineralogical Museums together with those of Numismatics, Sphragistics, and Archeology are stimulating the interests of students.

 Faculties 
Faculty of Applied Mathematics and Informatics
Faculty of International Relations
Faculty of Biology
Faculty of Journalism
Faculty of Chemistry
Faculty of Law
Faculty of Economics
Faculty of Mechanics and Mathematics
Faculty of Electronics
Faculty of Philology
Faculty of Foreign Languages
Faculty of Philosophy
Faculty of Geography
Faculty of Physics
Faculty of Geology
Faculty of Preuniversity Training
Faculty of History
Department of Pedagogy
Department of Law

 Research divisions and facilities 

Scientific Research Department
Zoological museum
University Library
Journal of Physical Studies
The Institute of Archaeology
Ukrainian journal of computational linguistics
Media Ecology Institute
Modern Ukraine
Institute for Historical Research
Regional Agency for Sustainable Development
Botanical Garden
NATO Winter Academy in Lviv
Scientific technical & educational center of low temperature studies

 University management 
 Rector Volodymyr Melnyk, Doctor of Philosophy, Professor, Corresponding Member of the National Academy of Sciences of Ukraine;
 First Vice-Rector Andriy Gukalyuk, Candidate of Economic Sciences, Associate Professor;
 Vice-Rector for Research Roman Hladyshevsky, Corresponding Member of the National Academy of Sciences of Ukraine, Doctor of Chemical Sciences, Professor;
 Vice-rector for scientific and pedagogical work and social issues and development Volodymyr Kachmar, Candidate of Historical Sciences, Associate Professor;
 Vice-rector for scientific and pedagogical work and informatization Vitaliy Kukharsky, Candidate of Physical and Mathematical Sciences, Associate Professor;
 Vice-rector for administrative and economic work Vasyl Kurlyak, Candidate of Physical and Mathematical Sciences, Associate Professor.

 International cooperation 
During 2016–2017, the university signed 15 cooperation agreements and two double degree agreements, two agreements were extended. In total, 147 agreements have been signed with higher education institutions from 38 countries.

The university is involved in signing the Magna Charta Universitatum.  In 2000, the university became a co-founder of the European College of Polish and Ukrainian Universities (Lublin, Poland). Agreements with Alecu Russo State University of Bălți (Bălți, Moldova) and the Krakow Pedagogical Academy (Poland) have been extended.

Students of the faculty of Geography, History and the faculty of International Relations undergo internships in Poland, Germany, Austria, Hungary, the Czech Republic, and Slovakia. Employees of the faculty of Mechanics, Mathematics, Philology, Chemistry, Faculty of International Relations and Applied Mathematics and Informatics worked in higher education institutions in Poland, Colombia, France, Switzerland, and Austria on a contract basis. Many graduates continue their studies in higher education institutions in the United States, Poland, Germany, Austria, Britain, and France. In 2016, Ivan Franko National University of Lviv held 5 international summer schools.

In 2016, active international cooperation was established with foreign partners. The university has conducted bilateral research with the University of Vienna (Austria), Kaunas University of Technology (Lithuania), the US Civilian Research and Development Foundation, and the Hiroshima Institute of Technology (Japan), funded by the Ministry of Education and Science of Ukraine.

In recent years, researchers at the university have been conducting experiments funded by international organizations, including the Max Planck Institute for Biophysical Chemistry (Germany), Harvard Medical School (USA), Novartis Institute for Biomedical Research (USA), and the Canadian Institute of Ukrainian Studies at the University of Alberta, International Center for Diffraction Data (USA), Andrew W. Mellon Foundation (USA), Trust Educational Foundation for Tree Research (USA), Material. Phases. Data. System company (Switzerland).

An agreement has been signed with CrossRef, which allows the DOI to be assigned to university publications. The university, with the financial support of the Ministry of Education and Science of Ukraine, has a national contact point of the EU Framework Program "Horizon 2020" in the thematic areas "Future and latest technologies" and "Inclusive, innovative and smart society".

 Notable alumni 
 Roman Aftanazy (1914–2004), historian of culture, librarian, heritage rescuer
 Kazimierz Ajdukiewicz (1890–1963), philosopher, mathematician and logician, a pioneer of categorial grammar
 Piotr Ignacy Bieńkowski (1865–1925), classical scholar and archaeologist, professor of the Jagiellonian University
 Julia Brystiger (1902–1975), political militant, member of the security apparatus of the Polish People's Republic
 Józef Białynia Chołodecki (1852–1934), historian of Lviv.
 Marianna Dushar, anthropologist and food writer.
 Ivan Franko (1856–1916), poet and linguist, reformer of the Ukrainian language
 Ludwik Fleck (1896–1961), medical doctor and biologist who developed in the 1930s the concept of thought collectives
 Stanisław Głąbiński (1862–1941) politician, professor and rector (1908–1909) of the university, lawyer and writer
 Georgiy R. Gongadze (1969–2000), Georgian and Ukrainian journalist
 Mark Kac (1914–1984), mathematician, pioneer of modern probability theory
 Yevhen Konovalets (1891–1938) leader of the Organization of Ukrainian Nationalists between 1929 and 1938.
 Emil Korytko (1813–1839), Polish philologist and ethnologist who worked in the Slovene Lands
 Stanisław Kot (1885–1975), scientist and politician, member of the Polish Government in Exile
 Tadeusz Kotarbiński (1881–1981), philosopher, mathematician, logician
 Hersch Lauterpacht (1897–1960), lawyer and Developer of the legal concept of "Crimes Against Humanity" in the Nuremberg Trials and writer of "An International Bill of the Rights of Man"
 Pinhas Lavon (1904–1976), Israeli politician
 Raphael Lemkin (1900–1959), lawyer who introduced the term "genocide", an author of the United Nations' Convention on Genocide
 Antoni Łomnicki (1881–1941), mathematician
 Jan Łukasiewicz (1878–1956), mathematician
 Stanisław Maczek (1892–1994), commander of the First Polish Armoured Division, the last Commander of the First Polish Army Corps under Allied Command
 Kazimierz Michałowski (1901–1981), archeologist and Egyptologist
 Semyon Mogilevich (1946–), economist and mafia boss
 Bohdan Ihor Antonych (1909–1937), prominent Ukrainian writer
 Jan Parandowski (1895–1978), writer, essayist, and translator, expert on classical antiquity
 Stepan Popel (1909–1987), Ukrainian chess player and linguist
 Maciej Rataj (1884–1940), Polish politician, acting president
 Jaroslav Rudnyckyj (1910–1995), Ukrainian Canadian linguist, lexicographer, folklorist
 Ivan L. Rudnytsky (1919–1984), Canadian historian of Ukraine, political scientist, Public intellectual
 Leon Reich (1879–1929), lawyer and member of the Sejm of Poland
 Józef Schreier (1909–1943), mathematician
 Bruno Schulz (1892–1942), novelist and painter
 Markiyan Shashkevych (1811–1843), Ukrainian poet
 Zoia Skoropadenko (1978–), Ukrainian artist
 Josyf Slipyj (1892–1984), head of the Ukrainian Greek Catholic Church
 Louis B. Sohn (1914–2006), international law scholar and advisor, helped create the International Court of Justice, advisor to United States State Department, chaired professor at Harvard University and University of Georgia law schools in the United States
 Leonid Stein (1934–1973), grandmaster and Soviet Chess Champion
 Hugo Steinhaus (1887–1982), mathematician, educator, and humanist
 Julian Stryjkowski (1905–1996), Polish-Jewish journalist and writer
 Irena Turkevycz-Martynec (1899–1983), Ukrainian Opera Soprano
 Stefania Turkewich (1898–1977), Ukrainian composer, pianist, and musicologist
 Yuri Velykanovych (1910–1938), journalist, volunteer of the International Brigades
 Aizik Isaakovich Vol'pert (1923–2006), mathematician and chemical engineer
 Rudolf Weigl (1883–1957), biologist and inventor of the first effective vaccine for epidemic typhus
 Władysław Witwicki (1878–1948), psychologist, philosopher, translator and artist
 Liubomyr Zubach (b. 1978), Ukrainian politician

 Notable professors 
 Henryk Arctowski (1871–1958) - oceanographer, Antarctica explorer
 Szymon Askenazy (1866–1935) - historian, diplomat and politician, founder of the Lwów-Warsaw School of History
 Herman Auerbach (1901–1942) - mathematician
 Stefan Banach (1892–1945) - mathematician, one of the moving spirits of the Lwów School of Mathematics, father of functional analysis
 Oswald Balzer (1858–1933) - historian of law and statehood
 St. Józef Bilczewski (1860–1923) - archbishop of the city of Lwów of the Latins
 Franciszek Bujak (1921–1941) - historian
 Leon Chwistek (1884–1944) - Avant-garde painter, theoretician of modern art, literary critic, logician, philosopher and mathematician
 Antoni Cieszyński (1882–1941) - physician, dentist and surgeon
 Matija Čop (1797–1835) - Slovene philologist and literary theorist
 Jan Czekanowski (1882–1965) - anthropologist, statistician and linguist
 Władysław Dobrzaniecki (1897–1941) - physician and surgeon
 Stanisław Głąbiński (1862–1941) - politician, rector (1908–1909), lawyer and writer
 Yakiv Holovatsky (1814–1888) - poet
 Mykhailo Hrushevsky (1866–1934) - historian, organizer of scholarship, leader of the pre-revolution Ukrainian national movement, head of Ukraine's parliament, first president of Ukraine, who wrote an academic book titled: "Bar Starostvo: Historical Notes: XV-XVIII" about the history of Bar, Ukraine.
 Stefan Inglot (1902–1994) - historian.
 Zygmunt Janiszewski (1888–1920), mathematician,
 Antoni Kalina (1846–1905) - ethnographer and ethnologist.
 Ignacy Krasicki (1735–1801) - writer and poet, senator, Bishop of Warmia and Archbishop of Gniezno and Primate of Poland
 Jerzy Kuryłowicz (1895–1978) - linguist
 Karolina Lanckorońska (1898–2002) - historian and art historian, Polish World War II resistance fighter
 Jan Łukasiewicz (1878–1956) - logician and philosopher
 Ignác Martinovics (1755–1795) - physicist, Franciscan, Hungarian revolutionary
 Stanisław Mazur (1905–1981) - mathematician
 Jakub Karol Parnas (1884–1949) - (Russian: Яков Оскарович Парнас or Yakov Oskarovich Parnas). A Jewish-Polish–Soviet biochemist author of notable studies on carbohydrates metabolism in mammals. Glycolysis, a major metabolic mechanism, is universally named Embden-Meyerhoff-Parnas pathway after him.
 Eugeniusz Romer (1871–1954) - cartographer
 Eugeniusz Rybka (1898–1988) - astronomer, deputy director of the International Astronomical Union,
 Stanisław Ruziewicz (1881–1941) - mathematician
 Wacław Sierpiński (1882–1969) - mathematician, known for contributions to set theory, number theory, theory of functions and topology
 Marian Smoluchowski (1872–1917) - scientist, pioneer of statistical physics, creator the basis of the theory of stochastic processes, mountaineer
 Hugo Steinhaus (1887–1972), mathematician
 Szczepan Szczeniowski (1898-1979) - physicist, author of numerous papers on cosmic rays,
 Kazimierz Twardowski (1866–1938), philosopher and logician, head of the Lwów-Warsaw School of Logic
 Tadeusz Boy-Żeleński (1874–1941) - gynecologist, writer, poet, art critic, translator of French literary classics and journalist
 Rudolf Weigl (1883-1957) - biologist, epidemiologist
 Aleksander Zawadzki (1798-1868) - naturalist
 Viktor Pynzenyk (born 1954) - economist and politician

 Other 
 Włodzimierz Dzieduszycki (1825–1899), landowner, naturalist, political activist, collector and patron of arts
 Stanisław Lem (1921–2006), satirical, philosophical, and science fiction writer
 Ignacy Jan Paderewski (1860–1941) virtuoso pianist, composer, diplomat and politician, the third Prime Minister of Poland
 János Bolyai (1802–1860) The founder of noneuclidean (absolute) geometry. The highest figure of Hungarian mathematics worked at the University of Lviv from 1831 to 1832.

 See also 
 List of early modern universities in Europe
 Massacre of Lwów professors
 Ukrainian Free University

Notes

References

Literature

 Academia Militans. Uniwersytet Jana Kazimierza we Lwowie, red. Adam Redzik, Kraków 2015, ss. 1302.
 Ludwik Finkel, Starzyński Stanisław, Historya Uniwersytetu Lwowskiego, Lwów 1894.
 Franciszek Jaworski, Uniwersytet Lwowski. Wspomnienie jubileuszowe, Lwów 1912.
 Adam Redzik, Wydział Prawa Uniwersytetu Lwowskiego w latach 1939–1946, Lublin 2006
 Adam Redzik, Prawo prywatne na Uniwersytecie Jana Kazimierza we Lwowie, Warszawa 2009.
 Józef Wołczański, Wydział Teologiczny Uniwersytetu Jana Kazimierza 1918–1939, Kraków 2000.
 Universitati Leopoliensi, Trecentesimum Quinquagesimum Anniversarium Suae Fundationis Celebranti. In Memoriam''. Praca zbiorowa. Polska Akademia Umiejętności, Kraków 2011,

External links 
History of the University of Lviv to 1945 

LNU Online Judge System

 
1661 establishments in the Polish–Lithuanian Commonwealth
Educational institutions established in the 1660s
Defunct universities and colleges in Poland
Universities and colleges in Lwow Voivodeship
Universities and colleges in the Polish–Lithuanian Commonwealth
Former universities and colleges of Jesuits
National universities in Ukraine
Institutions with the title of National in Ukraine